The Department of the Arts and Administrative Services was an Australian government department that existed between March 1993 and January 1994.

Scope
Information about the department's functions and/or government funding allocation could be found in the Administrative Arrangements Orders, the annual Portfolio Budget Statements and in the Department's annual reports.

At the department's creation it was responsible for:
Acquisition, leasing, management and disposal of land and property in Australia and overseas
Transport and storage services
Coordination of purchasing policy and civil purchasing
Disposal of goods
Analytical laboratory services
Ionospheric prediction
Management of government records
Valuation services
Geodesy, mapping and surveying services
Planning, execution and maintenance of Commonwealth Government works
Design and maintenance of Government furniture, furnishings and fittings
Government printing and publishing services
Electoral matters
Australian honours and symbols policy
Provision of facilities for members of Parliament other than in Parliament House
Administrative support for Royal Commissions and certain other inquiries
Information co-ordination and services within Australia, including advertising
Cultural affairs, including support for the arts.

Structure
The Department was an Australian Public Service department, staffed by officials who were responsible to the Minister for the Arts and Administrative Services.

References

Arts and Administrative Services
Ministries established in 1993
1993 establishments in Australia
1994 disestablishments in Australia